Tanjung Morawa is a large town and administrative district (kecamatan) within Deli Serdang Regency of North Sumatra Province, Indonesia.

Villages
It is composed of twenty-six 'villages' (urban kelurahan and rural desa), set out below with their areas and their populations at the 2020 Census.

References

Populated places in North Sumatra